Fanny Hill is the third studio album by the American all-woman rock group Fanny, released in February 1972 on Reprise. It was recorded at Apple Studios in London and reached No. 135 on the Billboard 200 charts. A single from the album, a cover of Marvin Gaye's "Ain't That Peculiar", hit the Billboard Hot 100. It is named after Fanny Hill, the 1748 erotic novel which was, in the 1960s, repeatedly prosecuted and republished.

Background and recording
By late 1971, Fanny had achieved some critical and commercial success, with the title track to the album Charity Ball reaching the Billboard top 40.

Fanny Hill  was recorded at Apple Studios in London and produced by Richard Perry. Former Beatles associate Geoff Emerick engineered the album. Regular Rolling Stones sidesmen Bobby Keys and Jim Price performed on several tracks, particularly the Stones-influenced "Borrowed Time".

The opening track was a cover of Marvin Gaye's "Ain't That Peculiar", which was rearranged to include Latin-influenced percussion and a slide guitar solo from June Millington. It was released as a single, reaching No. 85 on the Billboard Hot 100. The group also covered the Beatles' "Hey Bulldog". Their arrangement included different lyrics to the original, which were reportedly approved by the Beatles.

Release
The album was originally released in February 1972 by Reprise Records. It reached No. 135 on the Billboard 200 chart. In 2015, an expanded version was released on CD by Real Gone Records, including out-takes and backing tracks.

Critical reception

The album received a good review in Rolling Stone, who said "the number of groups that can inspire affection the way Fanny have with this album, simply from the pure exuberance of their music, are far and few between". Robert Christgau had mixed opinions on the album, saying half of the original material was reasonable but that the group "give themselves away" by the two covers that opened each side. In a retrospective review, AllMusic's Mark Deming called it the group's "strongest and most exciting work."

Track listing

Notes
 Tracks 12, 15-17 from Fanny Hill sessions; recorded at Apple Studios, December 1971.
 Track 13 produced by Roy Silver, Mark Hammerman and Lord Trenchtown, engineered by Robert Appère.
 Track 14 recorded at Village Recorders, Hollywood. Produced by Richard Perry, engineered by Richard Moore.

Personnel
Taken from the sleeve notes.

 Fanny
 June Millington – electric, acoustic and slide guitar, clavinet, percussion, lead and backing vocals
 Jean Millington – bass, lead and backing vocals
 Nickey Barclay – piano, organ, keyboards, lead and backing vocals
 Alice de Buhr – drums, tambourine, lead and backing vocals

Additional musicians
 Bobby Keys – saxophones 
 Jim Price – brass 

Technical
 Richard Perry – production
 Geoff Emerick – engineering
 Phillip MacDonald – engineering
 Andy Johns – engineering
 Alan Harris – engineering
 Doug Sax – mastering
 David Bailey – front cover photo
 Amalie R. Rothschild – rear cover photo

References

External links
 Fanny Hill - Fanny Rocks (official website)

1972 albums
Fanny (band) albums
Albums produced by Richard Perry
Reprise Records albums